Naberezhnye Chelny (Yar Çallı, IPA: [ˈjar ɕɑlːɤ̆]) is the second largest city in the Republic of Tatarstan, Russia. Population: 

The city was briefly known as Brezhnev from 1982 to 1988.

History
Naberezhnye Chelny was granted town status on August 10, 1930, and was called Brezhnev (after Leonid Brezhnev) from 1982 to 1988.

The city of Naberezhnye Chelny was one of the residence centers of the Udmurt Jews, who spoke Udmurtish Yiddish.

Administrative and municipal status
Within the framework of administrative divisions, Naberezhnye Chelny serves as the administrative center of Tukayevsky District, even though it is not a part of it. As an administrative division, it is incorporated separately as the city of republic significance of Naberezhnye Chelny—an administrative unit with the status equal to that of the districts. As a municipal division, the city of republic significance of Naberezhnye Chelny is incorporated as Naberezhnye Chelny Urban Okrug.

Economy
Kamaz and ZMA trucks are produced there, and the city is one of the largest planned centers in the world related to vehicle production. With more than  dedicated to production, the Kamaz plant is the largest vehicle factory in the world.

SPRUT Technology, Ltd. oldest Russian's developers of PC-based CAx software including SprutCAM was founded in 1987 in Naberezhnye Chelny.

Transportation

Long-distance transport
Naberezhnye Chelny is a major railway, motor transport, and aviation hub, known on the Kama river port.

The city has a structural unit of the Kuibyshev Railway JSC "Russian Railways" - Kama KBS railway department, which carries out operational management of transport in the Kama region (railroad Agryz Akbash). Immediately Naberezhnye Chelny city is served by two railway stations.

The first, Red Field with 28 station tracks for incoming and outgoing trains, a freight yard for loading and unloading cars, and a sorting slide for the formation and separation of trains.

The second, its cargo-passenger station Naberezhnye Chelny accommodates loading and unloading of wagons supplied by access roads to distribution centers and processing plants. A modern combined train and bus station was built allowing simultaneous reception of 1,500 passengers. The station Naberezhnye Chelny long-distance trains follow a direct line to Moscow, Kazan, Ulyanovsk, Izhevsk, Bugul'ma, and in the summer to Adler. Local train service provided flights rail buses to Mendeleyevsk and Bugul'my.

In addition, the city has departmental railway sector, belonging to OJSC "KAMAZ" and JSC "Kamgesenergostroy" that can handle up to 1,200 cars per day.

River port Naberezhnye Chelny allows you to receive treatment under dry cargo and passenger ships mixed "river-sea". It has a dock for the processing, storage of packaged cargoes and containers. Its length is 217 linear meters, with design possibilities for cargo up to 112 tons in the navigation. The port has a river and a passenger station, which can simultaneously dock four vessels. Infrastructure station can serve up to 200,000 passengers for navigation.

International Airport Begishevo serves the cities Nizhnekamsk agglomeration and Nizhnekamsk WPK.

Public transportation
Public transport represents 13 tram routes, more than 30 bus routes and taxi, the taxi (including the so-called Social taxi carrying several passengers fares in taxis).

The Naberezhnochelninsky tram is one of the latest new tram systems in the USSR and Russia. It was created to provide a large passenger flow between the residential areas of the city and a vast industrial complex KAMAZ and other large enterprises. Unlike most in post-Soviet Russia, the city's tram system expanded in the 1990s and 2000s, and has plans for further development, including both new construction sites in the city, and creating an inter-city light rail line to the Yelabuga, a project which was developed in the Soviet period.

Culture
Alkonost, a Russian doom-folk metal band, was formed in Naberezhnye Chelny in 1995.

Sports
FC KAMAZ Naberezhnye Chelny is an association football club based in Naberezhnye Chelny, playing in the Russian Second Division.

Gallery

Sister cities
 Liaocheng, China (since 2009)

References

Notes

Sources

 
Populated places on the Kama River
Menzelinsky Uyezd